BKE may refer to:
New York Stock Exchange symbol for Buckle (clothing retailer)
Butterworth–Kulim Expressway, an interstate expressway in Malaysia
Bukit Timah Expressway, an expressway in Singapore
International Air Transport Association code for Baker City Municipal Airport, Baker City, Oregon
Bilateral key exchange, an encryption scheme